Olympic 4 is the fourth album of the Czech band Olympic from 1973.  It was published by Supraphon. Its catalogue number is 1 13 1475. Covers show some draws about the members.

Track list

Side A 

 Karneval (Petr Hejduk/Václav Fischer) – 3:57
 Stará láhev (Petr Janda/Václav Fischer) – 3:27
 Konec konců (Petr Hejduk/Ladislav Křístek) – 3:39
 Blázen (Petr Janda/Michal Prostějovský) – 3:03
 Únos (Petr Janda/Zdeněk Rytíř) – 5:10

Side B 
 Harém (Petr Janda/Václav Fischer) – 4:55
 Jsem zvláštní (Petr Janda/Mirek Černý) – 5:31
 Vůně benzínu (Petr Janda/Václav Fischer) – 4:22
 Kánon (Petr Janda/Zdeněk Rytíř) – 3:59

References

Olympic (band) albums
1973 albums